The biennial election for the Mayor of Raleigh, North Carolina was held on October 8, 2013. The election was nonpartisan. Incumbent Mayor Nancy McFarlane ran for a second term.
She received a majority of the vote on October 8, thus avoiding a runoff, which would have been held on November 5.

Candidates
Nancy McFarlane, Mayor since 2011, former City Council member
Venita Peyton, real estate broker 
Robert Weltzin, chiropractor

Results

Notes

External links
Wake County Board of Elections

2013
Raleigh
Raleigh